Henry Guppy CBE (31 December 1861 – 4 August 1948) was Librarian of the John Rylands Library in Manchester from 1899 until his death in 1948.

Guppy was born in London and educated at City of London School. Before moving to the John Rylands he was Sub-Librarian of Sion College. When appointed librarian in 1899 it was jointly with Edward Gordon Duff; he became sole Librarian from October 1900. He was created Commander of the Order of the British Empire (CBE) in 1937. He was active in the Library Association of Great Britain and among his notable achievements are contributions to the reconstruction of the university library of Louvain between the World Wars and the founding of the Bulletin of the John Rylands Library in 1903. During much of his tenure in Manchester he resided at Buxton, where he died. He was survived by his wife Matilda, with whom he had two daughters, Lilian and Alberta.

Selected works

Bulletin of the John Rylands Library, 1903–08, 1914-48 (editor and contributor)
The John Rylands Library, Manchester: 1899-1935 (a revised edition of the work first published in 1924)
A Classified Catalogue of the Works on Architecture and the Allied Arts in the Principal Libraries of Manchester and Salford (editor, with Guthrie Vine). 1909

References
 Obituary in: Bulletin of the John Rylands Library. Vol. 31, pp. 173–79
 Oxford DNB
 Bulletin of the John Rylands University Library, Volume 25 (1941): "In Honour of Henry Guppy", edited by H. B. Charlton (contents include bibliography of Dr Guppy's writings; memoir of him by Charlton)

External links

1861 births
1948 deaths
People from Buxton
People educated at the City of London School
Librarians from London
Commanders of the Order of the British Empire
Academic journal editors
John Rylands Research Institute and Library